Perdue Hill is an unincorporated community in Monroe County, Alabama.  It has one site listed on the Alabama Register of Landmarks and Heritage, the Perdue Hill Masonic Lodge. The home of William B. Travis is located along U.S. Route 84 in Perdue Hill and was moved here in 1985 from Claiborne.

Demographics

Perdue Hill was listed on the 1880 and 1890 U.S. Censuses. In 1890, it was the only community separately returned in Monroe County, hence making it the largest community. It did not appear on the census again after 1890.

Geography

References

Unincorporated communities in Alabama
Unincorporated communities in Monroe County, Alabama